The Lviv High Castle is a historic castle located on the top of the Castle Hill of the city of Lviv. The castle currently stands in ruins.

The High Castle is proximate to the centre of Lviv (see picture), formerly being surrounded by a fortification wall. The Castle Hill took its name from the High Castle (as opposed to the other, Low Castle), which used to be located on the hill from the 13th century to the late 19th century. The castle was a main defensive fort of the city during its existence.

As it follows from Rus' Chronicles, the first fortifying structures appeared on the Castle Hill in the time Halych-Volhynia, and were built by Leo I of Halych from wood. It was originally a wood and soil construction, as most others at that time. In 1259 by a request of Burunday Khan they were destroyed. In 1270 they were rebuilt. 

In 1340, when Lviv was captured by Casimir III of Poland the wooden castle was put under fire. In 1353 it was destroyed again by Lithuanians. A new brick castle appeared on the hill in 1362 by the king Casmimir III. It became the residence of Polish nobles. In 1537, the castle witnessed a rebellion known as the Chicken War against Polish king Sigismund I the Old and his wife Bona Sforza. 

The castle was rebuilt and repaired many times. In the times of Khmelnytsky Uprising it was taken by Cossack forces of Colonel Maksym Kryvonis in October 1648. In 1704, when Lviv was occupied by Swedes the castle was heavily damaged. In 1777, Austrians initiated disassembling of fortifications around the castle.

In the 19th century, the then destroyed castle was taken apart and new facilities were built in its place. The fortification was strengthened, trees were planted on the hill's slope, and a park was constructed. On the place where the castle once stood, a Union of Lublin Mound was constructed in 1869, dedicated to the 300-years of the Union of Lublin. Currently, an observation platform is located atop the kurgan. In 1957, a 141-meter tall television tower was constructed on a ridge of the hill (see picture).

In 2004-2005, there were talks of reconstructing a stone castle on the hill. The project gained some support and opposition. However, at this time, plans for the construction of the castle are not realistic.

Highcastle: A Remembrance, a 1966 coming-of-age autobiographical novel by the Polish science fiction writer Stanisław Lem, refers to the castle.

Further reading
A. Kozykyi, Art. Vysokyi Zamok, in: Encyklopediya L'vova vol. 1, 2007, p. 366-368.

References

This article is based on the articles in the Russian, Ukrainian, and Polish Wikipedias.
 Castles.com.ua - Vysokyi Zamok

External links

Buildings and structures in Lviv
Former castles in Ukraine
History of Lviv
Residences of Polish monarchs